The Anak Bukit railway station is a Malaysian railway station located at and named after the suburb of Anak Bukit, Alor Setar, Kedah.

This station is nearby the Sultan Abdul Halim Airport, within 5 to 8 minutes by taxi. This station is also close to the town of Jitra.

References

Kota Setar District
Railway stations in Kedah
KTM ETS railway stations
Railway stations opened in 2015